For the 19th-century baseball player, see Frank Whitney (baseball).

Frank DeArmon Whitney (born November 22, 1959) is a United States district judge of the United States District Court for the Western District of North Carolina.

Education and career

Born in Charlotte, North Carolina, Whitney received a Bachelor of Arts degree from Wake Forest University in 1982 where he was a member of the ROTC program and inducted into the Phi Beta Kappa Society. He earned a joint Juris Doctor and Master of Business Administration degree from the University of North Carolina School of Law and the University of North Carolina at Chapel Hill, respectively, in 1987. He entered private practice in Washington, D.C., in 1987. From 1988-89 he was a law clerk for Judge David B. Sentelle of the United States Court of Appeals for the District of Columbia Circuit before returning to private practice from 1989-90. He was an Assistant United States Attorney for the Western District of North Carolina from 1990-2001. He was in private practice in Charlotte from 2001 to 2002, and was then the United States Attorney for the Eastern District of North Carolina from 2002-06.

Federal judicial service

Whitney was nominated by President George W. Bush on February 14, 2006, to a seat on the United States District Court for the Western District of North Carolina vacated by Harold Brent McKnight. Whitney was confirmed by the United States Senate on June 22, 2006, and received his commission on July 5, 2006. He served as Chief Judge from June 2, 2013 to June 2, 2020.

Military service

Whitney attended The JAG School at the University of Virginia. He served in the United States Army JAG Corps from 1982 to 2012. According to a JAG Corps historian, he is the first federal judge to serve as a military judge presiding over courts-martial in a combat theater. He also presided over the last court martial in Iraq before the complete withdrawal of U.S. troops from the country.

References

External

Resume at the United States Department of Justice archive

1959 births
Living people
American military lawyers
United States Army personnel of the Iraq War
Assistant United States Attorneys
Judges of the United States District Court for the Western District of North Carolina
Lawyers from Charlotte, North Carolina
United States Army colonels
United States Attorneys for the Eastern District of North Carolina
United States district court judges appointed by George W. Bush
21st-century American judges
Charlotte Country Day School alumni
University of North Carolina School of Law alumni
Wake Forest University alumni
The Judge Advocate General's Legal Center and School alumni